Kayışlar is a village in the Mengen District, Bolu Province, Turkey. Its population is 128 (2021).

References

Villages in Mengen District